The Amazing Screw-On Head is a one-shot comic book written and drawn by Mike Mignola and published by Dark Horse Comics in 2002, starring the character of the same name. The Amazing Screw-On Head stars a robot living during the Lincoln administration whose head can be attached to different bodies with different tactical abilities, and who functions as an agent of the U.S. government.

The idea for the character was inspired by action figures, particularly Batman ones, which seemed to Mignola to be the same figurines with different paint jobs. Mignola imagined a robot with a head that screwed onto different bodies to suit the occasion, hence "Screw-on Head". An animated pilot, based on the plot of the comic, was produced by the Sci-Fi Channel in 2006, with Bryan Fuller as writer and executive producer and Chris Prynoski as director.

Plot

Comic
Screw-On Head is an agent for President Abraham Lincoln. He is summoned by Lincoln to track down Emperor Zombie, an undead occultist and originally a groundskeeper at Hyde Park. Zombie and his henchmen, the vampire Madam and scientist Dr. Snap, have stolen an ancient manuscript. This will allow him access to the temple of Gung, a warlord who nearly conquered the world over ten thousand years ago with supernatural power gained from "a fabulous melon-sized jewel", which Zombie obviously plans to use for himself.

With the aid of his manservant, Mr. Groin, and dog Mr. Dog, Screw-On Head manages to track down Zombie, but not before the villain and his henchmen find the treasure: instead of a jewel, the tomb contains a turnip with "a small parallel universe" inside. Zombie unleashes the Demigod within, but Screw-On Head manages to defeat it in combat.

TV pilot
The 22-minute pilot differs from the comic mainly in that the characters are fleshed out with backstories. Rather than a master of languages, Emperor Zombie (David Hyde Pierce) is the first of Screw-On Head's (Paul Giamatti) manservants, who has turned to evil despite Screw-On Head's advice. Out of revenge for his first defeat, Zombie developed what he refers to as a "petty vengeance fetish", killing the seven replacement servants after him, and before Mr. Groin (Patton Oswalt), in gruesome ways. The pilot also featured Molly Shannon, Mindy Sterling, and Corey Burton in various roles as well. On July 12, 2006, The Amazing Screw-On Head TV pilot was aired online at scifi.com with a survey to decide whether or not the show went to series. According to Mike Mignola on the November 29, 2006 Fanboy Radio podcast, the series was not picked up by the Sci-Fi Channel. The pilot was released on DVD on February 6, 2007.

Awards
The Amazing Screw-On Head won the 2003 Eisner Award for Best Humor Publication.

See also
Abraham Lincoln, Vampire Hunter

References

External links

 Dark Horse Comic's product page

 Complete pilot on Youtube

Dark Horse Comics titles
Steampunk comics
Syfy original programming
One-shot comic titles
2002 comics debuts
Dark Horse Comics superheroes
Fictional robots
Fictional secret agents and spies
Television pilots not picked up as a series
Television shows based on Dark Horse Comics
Characters created by Mike Mignola
Eisner Award winners for Best Humor Publication